Abu, also known as Ua (meaning 'no'), is an Arapesh language (Torricelli family) of Papua New Guinea. It is dying, as speakers are shifting to Tok Pisin.

Abu is spoken in:
East Sepik Province: Albiges/Mablep Rural LLG, ward 8 (Wamsak / Amom)
Sandaun Province: East Aitape Rural LLG, wards 23, 24, 25 (respectively: Wamsis, Balup, Matapau)

References

External links 
OLAC resources in and about the Abu' Arapesh language

Arapesh languages
Languages of Sandaun Province
Languages of East Sepik Province